Mitzi Kuroda is a professor of genetics at Harvard Medical School and Brigham and Women's Hospital. She was an HHMI Investigator at Brigham and Women's Hospital from 1993 to 2007. She has identified many genes and enzymes involved in epigenetic regulation in the fruit fly. In addition, her research has shown the importance of epigenetics in cancer. Her laboratory has identified chromatin remodeling signals and processes that predispose cells to be transformed into cancer cells.

Early life and education 
Mitzi Kuroda was born in 1958 in Fayetteville, Arkansas, where she attended elementary and junior high schools. She spent a year in Tokyo before returning to attend Fayetteville High School where she graduated as valedictorian in 1977.

Mitzi Kuroda said, "When I learned about recombinant DNA in college, it captured my imagination. I had to toss aside all my plans to 'save the world' because the ability to make specific DNA molecules for molecular genetic experiments was just too enticing." Kuroda received her BS in biology from Tulane University in 1981 and her PhD in biological sciences at Stanford University, working with mentor Charles Yanofsky. Kuroda's work with Yanofsky involved collaboration with Iwona Stroynowski to reveal how a riboswitch mechanism called bacterial attenuation regulates operons for amino acid biosynthesis.

Academic research career 
After postdoctoral work at Stanford, Kuroda became a faculty member at Baylor College of Medicine. She rose through the ranks at Baylor to full professor. In 2003, she moved to Harvard Medical School. Kuroda initially concentrated on regulation processes in the fruit fly. Her citation by the National Academy of Sciences upon her election said, "Her lab identified the MSL ribonucleoprotein complex, and discovered that it assembles and spreads from sites of non-coding roX RNA synthesis to regulate genes specifically on the fruit fly male X chromosome. Furthermore, they dissected the sex-specific regulation of this process, and the molecular mechanism by which the MSL complex influences transcriptional elongation." She has developed an important technique in which epigenetic regulators and their targets are cross-linked, then analyzed via mass spectrometry. In 2017, her laboratory discovered a master regulatory complex for Drosophila development.

Recently, she has begun studies of regulation in cancer cells. Kuroda's laboratory has shown that BRD4-NUT regulator leads to cancer via causing histone modification changes that produce a cascade of remodeling in which domains are opened to allow inappropriate expression of genes by transcription of their RNA.

Honors and awards 
1992 Searle Scholar

https://www.searlescholars.net/person/253

2013 National Academy of Sciences
National Academy of Arts and Sciences

Personal life 
Kuroda is married to geneticist Stephen Elledge, and they have two grown children.

Selected works

References 

American women biologists
Living people
American geneticists
Harvard Medical School faculty
Epigeneticists
Developmental biologists
1958 births
American women academics
21st-century American women